Nemjung is a mountain in the Himalayas of Nepal.

This mountain was once called Himlung Himal. In the 1990s, a few years after the first ascent in 1983, when demarcating the border with China, the Nepalese government changed the traditional name of Himlung Himal to another mountain about 4 kilometers north. The peak between them is properly called Himjung. It is the highest among the three peaks of Nemjung (east), Himjung (centre) and Himlung Himal range (west).

Nemjung was first climbed via the east ridge on October 27, 1983 by a Joint expedition from Nepal and the Hirosaki University Alpine Club led by Junji Kurotaki. Previous attempts had been made in 1963 by a Japanese expedition from the Den Den Kyushu Alpine Club led by Hisachika Zengyou; in 1994 by a British expedition; and in 2009 by a French team. On October 30, 2009 a Japanese team led by climber Osamu Tanabe summitted Nemjung via its previously unclimbed west face and west ridge.

See also
 List of mountains in Nepal
 List of Ultras of the Himalayas

References

Seven-thousanders of the Himalayas
Manang District, Nepal
Mountains of the Gandaki Province